You Are Teddybears is the debut album by Teddybears STHLM. It was released in 1993 by MVG.

Track listing

Musicians
 Pat (a.k.a. Patrik Arve) - vocals
 Klas (a.k.a. Klas Åhlund) - guitar
 Glenn (a.k.a. Glenn Sundell) - drums
 Jocko (a.k.a. Joakim Åhlund) - bass

Special guest appearances
 Jean-Louis Huhta
 David Nyström
 DJ Zeb

References
[ You Are Teddybears] at Allmusic

1993 debut albums
Teddybears (band) albums